William Bennett (born May 31, 1953) is an American former ice hockey left winger.

Career 
Bennett played 31 games in the National Hockey League for the Boston Bruins and Hartford Whalers between 1978 and 1980. After leaving the NHL, he played with the Wichita Wind, Hershey Bears, and Fort Wayne Komets.

Personal life 
Bennett's father, Harvey Bennett Sr., and two of his brothers (Curt Bennett and Harvey Bennett Jr. also played in the NHL.

Career statistics

Regular season and playoffs

External links
 

1953 births
Living people
American men's ice hockey left wingers
Boston Bruins players
Central Wisconsin Flyers players
Columbus Owls players
Des Moines Capitols players
Fort Wayne Komets players
Hartford Whalers players
Hershey Bears players
Ice hockey players from Rhode Island
Sportspeople from Cranston, Rhode Island
Sportspeople from Warwick, Rhode Island
Rochester Americans players
Springfield Indians players
Undrafted National Hockey League players
Waterloo Black Hawks players
Wichita Wind players